The 2018–19 Bangalore Super Division was the sixteenth season of the Bangalore Super Division which is the third tier of the Indian association football system and the top tier of the Karnataka football system. The season started on 21 October 2018. Ozone F.C. were the defending champions. The league was contested by top 9 teams from 2017–18 season as well as ADE and Bangalore Eagles who were promoted from 2017–18 Bangalore 'A' division. They replaced Jawahar Union and CIL who were relegated to 2019–20 Bangalore 'A' Division. Kickstart FC, Bengaluru United and Bangalore Dream United were direct entry teams, thus bringing total number of teams to 14.

Bengaluru FC 'B' won their first title with a game to spare. At the end of the season, Jawahar Union and CIL were relegated to 'A' Division.

Teams

Table

References

Bangalore Super Division seasons
4